The Mojave Nugget is a large gold nugget found in California, United States. It was found in the Stringer district near Randsburg by prospector Ty Paulsen in 1977 using a metal detector. The nugget, which weighs , is part of the Margie and Robert E. Petersen Collection of gold nuggets that was donated to the Natural History Museum of Los Angeles County. As of 2022, the scrap metal value of 4.9kg of gold is approximately 270,000 USD.

References

Gold nuggets
Natural history of the Mojave Desert
Metal detecting finds in United States
1977 in California